The College of Education and Human Sciences (CEHS) is one of nine colleges at the University of Nebraska–Lincoln (NU) in Lincoln, Nebraska, United States. The college was established on June 6, 2003 when the College of Human Resources and Family Sciences was merged with Teachers College. CEHS uses facilities across NU's City Campus and East Campus. Sherri Jones has served as dean of the college since 2019.

CEHS includes seven departments: teaching, learning, and teacher education; educational administration; educational psychology; child, youth and family studies; nutrition and health sciences; special education and communication disorders; and textiles, merchandising and fashion design.

History

The College of Education and Human Sciences at the University of Nebraska–Lincoln was established on June 6, 2003 when the University of Nebraska Board of Regents approved the merger of the College of Human Resources and Family Sciences and Teachers College.

In 2020, the university demolished Mabel Lee Hall and on the site constructed Caroline Edwards Pope Hall to house many CEHS programs. The $38 million, 126,590-square foot facility is named in honor of Caroline Pope, a longtime professor in the college who died in 2018. It was opened in September of 2022 in advance of hosting its first classes in January of 2023.

Programs

Child, Youth, and Family Studies
The University of Nebraska offered its first home economics class in 1905. The program gradually expanded and by 1962 included five departments: Family Economics and Management, Home Economics Education, Human Development and the Family, Textiles, Clothing and Design, and Food and Nutrition. In the 1970s, similar departments from NU and Omaha were merged.

NU established a nursery school in 1925, one of the first of its kind in the country. Three years later, a building specifically designed to house the child development lab was constructed under the guidance of program director Ruth Staples. Staples led the lab, which was later named in her honor, for nearly three decades. The program was moved to East Campus in 1969; in 2017, the university announced initial planning had begun to construct a new building for the Ruth Staples Child Development Lab.

Nutrition and Health Sciences
In 1891, the University of Nebraska established the Department of Health and Human Performance when physical training became mandatory for female students. Many of the school's early facilities were relocated from the Home Economics Building to the Nebraska Coliseum upon its completion in 1925; a standalone Food and Nutrition Building was completed in 1943 and was later renamed for longtime program director Ruth M. Leverton. The department is now primarily located across three East Campus buildings: Ruth Leverton Hall, Filley Hall, and the Gwnedolyn A. Newkirk Human Sciences Building.

The Nutrition and Health Science department includes the school's athletic training and nutrition science programs, both of which work closely with NU's athletics teams. In 2022, the university opened the Scarlet Hotel on Nebraska Innovation Campus, which will serve as the home of the Hospitality, Restaurant and Tourism Management program.

Teachers College
The University of Nebraska first offered pedagogy classes in 1888 and formally established Teachers College in 1908. Enrollment in the college grew rapidly following a statewide referendum in 1914 that required public school teachers to be college-educated, and in 1919 a new facility was completed to house Teachers College. The building (also named "Teachers College") was located on what was then the east edge of campus; though it has undergone significant modifications, the Teachers College building is still in use as part of the Canfield Administration Building North. The Teachers College program was relocated to the corner of 14th and Vine Streets in the 1950s and includes several of CEHS's pedagogy departments.

Textiles, Merchandising and Fashion Design

The Textiles, Merchandising and Fashion Design department was established at Nebraska in 1898 as the School of Domestic Science. Rosa Bouton led the program in its early years, and it quickly grew from twenty-seven students to approximately three hundred when she resigned in 1912. The School of Domestic Science initially focused on educating women in areas such as sewing, cooking, and finance, but expanded as opportunities for college women did. Eventually, the textiles school was split from the home economics school and joined what is now CEHS.

In 2020, chancellor Ronnie D. Green announced the Textiles, Merchandising and Fashion Design program was likely to be eliminated as part of budget cuts attributed to the COVID-19 pandemic. The school reversed course months later following "department restructuring."

International Quilt Museum
The Textiles, Merchandising and Fashion Design school operates the International Quilt Museum, which houses the largest known public collection of quilts in the world. The museum was founded in 1997 as the International Quilt Study Center and Museum following a donation of approximately 950 quilts from Ardis and Robert James. The center opened a new facility in 2008 just off NU's East Campus.

External links
College of Education and Human Sciences
Child, Youth and Family Studies
Educational Administration
Educational Psychology
Nutrition and Health Sciences
Special Education and Communication Disorders
Teaching, Learning and Teacher Education
Textiles, Merchandising and Fashion Design

References

University of Nebraska–Lincoln